Parmena mutilloides is a species of beetle in the family Cerambycidae. It was described by Pesarini and Sabbadini in 1992. It is known from Turkey.

References

Parmenini
Beetles described in 1992